Saint-Justin is the name of several places:

Canada
 Saint-Justin, Quebec

France
 Saint-Justin, in the Gers department
 Saint-Justin, in the Landes department